The Serra da Tiririca State Park is a state park in the state of Rio de Janeiro, Brazil.
It protects an area of rugged terrain on the Atlantic coast with Atlantic Forest vegetation.

Location

The Serra da Tiririca State Park is divided between the municipalities of Niterói and Maricá, Rio de Janeiro.
It has rugged terrain with slopes above 50° in some places.
The park includes eight hills, namely Morro do Elefante: , Alto Mourão: , Costão de Itacoatiara: , Morro do Telégrafo: , Morro do Catumbi: , Morro da Penha:  and Morro da Serrinha: .

History

The Serra da Tiririca region has many archaeological sites, particularly in Itaipu, which has important sambaquis (middens) left by different groups of indigenous people.
When European settlers arrived the region was inhabited by Tamoios people.
In the mid-16th century the Jesuits erected buildings in Itaipu to catechize the local people.
Charles Darwin commented on the biological diversity when he visited in 1832 en route to Cabo Frio.

Creation of the park was due to a campaign by civil society against damage to the environment that began in the early 1980s and included environmental groups, residents' associations and other residents of the region. 
A Public Civil Action, the first in Brazil, was filed by the Public Prosecutor against an illegal subdivision. 
The Tiririca Front was active in 1989-90 but lost support due to its overly politicized activity.
After this the Ecological Citizenship Movement (MCE) led development of a study to prepare the technical and legal basis for the park, including a draft built that was forwarded to the state legislature through Carlos Minc.

The Serra da Tiririca State Park was created by state law 1.902 of 29 November 1991 with the objective of protecting the Atlantic Forest vegetation, sources of watercourses and fauna.
The provisional limits were defined by state decree 18.598 of 19 April 1993.
On 10 October 1992 UNESCO recognized the park as part of the Atlantic Forest Biosphere Reserve.
A 386-page guide to the park was published in June 2016 describing all the trails in the park, with 15 trails described in detail.

Environment

The vegetation of the Serra da Tiririca is in the Atlantic Forest biome, consisting of dense montane or submontane rainforest. 
Vegetation includes forest, with trees such as ipê-amarelo and quaresmeira, restingas, mangroves and marshes.
There are more than 150 species of birds, and many species of amphibians, reptiles and small mammals.

Visiting

The park is open daily from 07:00 to 18:00, or 19:00 in summer.
The visitor's reception center is in the Itacoatiara neighborhood of Niterói.
Darwin's route is now the  Darwin Trail from Engenho do Mato in Niterói to Itaocaia in Maricá.
Other  trails in the park lead to lookouts over the city of Rio de Janeiro and the beaches of Niterói and Maricá.
Visitors may practice extreme sports such as rappelling and rock climbing.

Notes

Sources

State parks of Brazil
Protected areas established in 1991
1991 establishments in Brazil
Protected areas of Rio de Janeiro (state)